Emily Benet is a London-based author who has Welsh and Spanish parents. She moved between London and Barcelona in her childhood.

Writing career

Benet has written three notable books, Shopgirl Diaries, Spray Painted Bananas, and "#PleaseRetweet". Spray Painted Bananas was republished in September 2014 by Harper Impulse, an imprint of Harper Collins and renamed the Temp. #PleaseRetweet is her latest book, published in August 2015.

She lists herself as a Wattpad sensation after her book received over one million hits, which led to her signing with a literary agent: MBA. She has a two-book deal with Harper Impulse.

ShopGirl Diaries

Her debut novel, Shopgirl diaries, began as a blog about working in her parents' chandelier shop and was commissioned as a book by Salt Publishing. It was also made into a short film starring Blake Harrison from the Inbetweeners, Katy Wix and Annette Badland. The short film was selected for The London Short Film Festival in January 2014.

References

21st-century British novelists
British women novelists
British women short story writers
Living people
Year of birth missing (living people)
Place of birth missing (living people)
British people of Welsh descent
British people of Spanish descent
Writers from London
21st-century British women writers
21st-century British short story writers